Gianluca Comotto (born 16 October 1978) is a retired Italian footballer, who played as a defender.

Club career 
Comotto started his career at Ivrea of Serie D. He then played one season for Biellese, also in Serie D.

Torino 

He joined Torino in summer 1997, and played 12 games in two Serie B seasons. After Torino won promotion to Serie A, he was farmed to Vicenza, where he won promotion again. He made his Serie A debut during on loan at Vicenza on 1 October 2000, in a match against AC Milan. Comotto returned to Torino in summer 2001, and played his first Serie A season for Torino.

Torino relegated in summer 2003, and Comotto successively played for Reggina (Serie A) and Fiorentina (Serie B), and then returned to Torino in 2004. Comotto helped the team win promotion back to Serie A again.

Roma and Return to Turin 
However, because of the bankruptcy of Torino Calcio, Comotto was released for free in July 2005. Instead of signing a new contract with new Torino (Torino F.C.) in Serie B, he signed a 3-year contract with AS Roma, worth €600,000 per season in gross, on 18 August, and loaned him to Ascoli until the end of the 2005–06 season. Comotto was re-signed by Torino in summer 2006 in a temporary deal, for €250,000 loan fee. Turin bought back 50% registration rights of Comotto  in January 2007 for €1.05 million and Torino got the full rights in June 2007 for another €1.525M, making his transfer fee was €2.825 million in total.

Comotto captained Torino in 2007–08 season, but his season came to early end at March 2008 due to injuries.

Fiorentina 
On 5 July 2008 Comotto signed for Serie A club Fiorentina for €4.8 million (but also cost La Viola an additional €198,000 as other fee) A bad injury excluded Comotto from the Champions league squad list for 2008. He made his Viola debut on 21 September 2008 in Fiorentina-Bologna, which finished 1–0. He also made his debut in the Champions League in the first leg of the qualifiers against Sporting Clube de Portugal on 18 August 2009 in the Stadium Jose Alvalade. He was the starting right-back in 2008–09 and 2009–10 season, but lost his place to Lorenzo De Silvestri in 2010–11 Serie A season. That season he only started 16 times and only re-picked by coach in October after he criticized his squad is a reason for bad results.

Cesena 

On 9 July 2011, Comotto signed a two-year deal with Cesena.

Perugia 

After his contract with Cesena expired, Comotto signed a deal with Perugia, winning his first Lega Pro championship and gaining promotion to 2014–15 Serie B.

Scouting career 

Fiorentina sporting director, Panteleo Corvino confirmed that from 4 September, Gianluca Comotto will be appointed as the club's new head of scouting. The club's attention will be turning to finding emerging talent in Portugal and Spain.

Honours 

Torino
 Serie B Runner-up: 1998–99, 2004–05

References

External links 
 Player stats

1978 births
Living people
People from Ivrea
Italian footballers
Torino F.C. players
L.R. Vicenza players
ACF Fiorentina players
Reggina 1914 players
A.S. Roma players
Ascoli Calcio 1898 F.C. players
A.C. Cesena players
A.S.D. Calcio Ivrea players
A.C. Perugia Calcio players
Serie A players
Serie B players
Serie C players
Serie D players
Association football defenders
Footballers from Piedmont
Sportspeople from the Metropolitan City of Turin